Tomasz Polczyk (born 13 February 1997) is a Polish volleyball player, a member of Poland men's national volleyball team U19, U19 European Champion 2015.

Career

National team
On April 12, 2015 Poland men's national volleyball team U19 team, including Polczyk, won title of U19 European Champion 2015. They beat in final Italy U19 (3–1). He took part in European Youth Olympic Festival with Polish national U19 team. On August 1, 2015 he achieved gold medal (final match with Bulgaria 3–0).

Sporting achievements

National team
 2015  CEV U19 European Championship
 2015  European Youth Olympic Festival

References

1997 births
Living people
Polish men's volleyball players
Place of birth missing (living people)